Mat Bruso (born 1983) is an American vocalist best known as the lead singer of the metalcore band Bury Your Dead. He joined the band in 2003, shortly before the band signed to Victory Records and released their debut full-length album You Had Me at Hello.

Bruso left the band in January 2007 to become a teacher, mainly working at Fowler Middle School in Maynard, Massachusetts. He taught science until 2018.

Bruso is straight edge.

Bruso worked with Four Year Strong for their first album, Rise or Die Trying, providing additional vocals. He sang on "Chrono" on The Ghost Inside's album Returners and on the track "Goliath", on Catalepsy's album Bleed. More recently, he appeared on the intro track of Kublai Khan's 2015 release New Strength, entitled "Life for a Life"

On January 17, 2011, it was announced that Bruso had rejoined Bury Your Dead. His first show back with the band was on April 15, 2011, at the annual New England Metal and Hardcore Festival in Worcester, Massachusetts.

Discography

Bury Your Dead
Studio albums
 Cover Your Tracks (2004)
 Beauty and the Breakdown (2006)
 Mosh n' Roll (2011)

References 

Nu metal singers
Living people
1989 births
21st-century American male singers
21st-century American singers
Bury Your Dead members